The Journal is a newspaper published in Seneca, South Carolina five days a week, Tuesday through Saturday, the paper delivered Saturday being labeled as a weekend edition.  It serves the western portion of upstate South Carolina, primarily Oconee County and western Pickens County, including Clemson University and the city of Clemson.  Its Facebook page lists its founding date as 1903.

See also

 List of newspapers in South Carolina

External links
The Journal official site
The Journal's facebook page
The Edwards Group, publisher
Edwards Printing, production company

Newspapers published in South Carolina
Seneca, South Carolina